Sumağavaqazma (also, Sumağava-Qazma and Sumagovakazma) is a village in the Davachi Rayon of Azerbaijan.  The village forms part of the municipality of Pirəbədil.

References 

Populated places in Shabran District